The Seton Hall Pirates men's basketball program is the NCAA Division I intercollegiate men's basketball program of Seton Hall University in South Orange, New Jersey. The team competes in the Big East Conference and plays their home games in the Prudential Center in Newark, New Jersey.

History

Seton Hall's first season of basketball occurred in 1903–04, but the school did not field a team again until 1908–09, the year in which the university achieved its first winning season. The school adopted the Pirate mascot in 1931, and the teams soon gained national prominence with the arrival of John "Honey" Russell in 1936. During an 18-year span, the Pirates racked up a 295–129 record that included an undefeated 19–0 record in 1939–40 as part of a 41-game unbeaten streak.  Walsh Gymnasium was opened in 1941 to house the basketball team permanently and featured one of the best Seton Hall teams of all time, termed the "Wonder Five", which led by All-American Bob Davies, earned the school's first NIT bid in 1941. Following World War II, the Pirates were led by stars Frank Saul and Bobby Wanzer and regularly played games at Madison Square Garden. The peak of this era occurred in 1953 when Richie Regan and Walter Dukes defeated rival St. John's University for the NIT title. Perhaps the low point for the team occurred in 1961 when a point shaving scandal sullied the program, but the Pirates rebounded to return to the NIT in 1974 under coach Bill Raftery. Seton Hall became a charter member of the Big East Conference in 1979, where they are still a member to this day.

Although Seton Hall did have a lengthly American Football Team, The high point of the Big East era for Seton Hall came when P. J. Carlesimo was hired in 1982 and the team began playing in the Meadowlands Arena. By 1988, Carlesimo led the Pirates to the school's first NCAA tournament appearance, and in 1989, he led the Hall to an unexpected tournament run to the NCAA Championship game, where they were defeated by Michigan in overtime. Success under Carlesimo continued with a Big East tournament championship and an Elite Eight appearance in 1991, a regular season Big East Championship and Sweet Sixteen appearance in 1992, and Big East Regular Season and Big East tournament Championships in 1993. Carlesimo left to coach in the NBA following the 1993–94 season, but Seton Hall returned to the Sweet Sixteen in 2000 guided by coach Tommy Amaker, and appeared in the NCAA tournament in 2004 and 2006 coached by Louis Orr. In 2006–07, Bobby Gonzalez was hired to lead the Pirates, which moved its home games into the Prudential Center in 2007. Gonzalez amassed a 66–59 record at Seton Hall but was fired at the conclusion of the 2009–10 after a first-round NIT loss to Texas Tech. Concerns were raised in-house about the direction Gonzalez was taking the program, punctuated by several incidents, some involving Gonzalez and others involving student athletes. Shortly after his dismissal Gonzalez was arrested for shoplifting. Seton Hall hired current coach Kevin Willard for the 2010–11 season.

After struggling to maintain a .500 record through his first five seasons with the program, Willard's Pirates finally broke through in the 2015–16 season, as they won the Big East tournament Championship over the eventual national champion Villanova Wildcats. With the win, Seton Hall secured the school's first NCAA Tournament appearance since 2006 and the first Big East tournament Championship since 1993. However, the magic could not continue in the NCAA tournament, as the team was defeated by the 11th-seeded Gonzaga Bulldogs in the First Round. In 2017, the Pirates were again eliminated in the First Round of the NCAA tournament by the Arkansas Razorbacks, but the Pirates would win their first tournament game in fourteen years upon defeating the NC State Wolfpack in 2018's first round before being defeated by the Kansas Jayhawks in the Second Round. Following the graduation of starting seniors Khadeen Carrington, Ángel Delgado, Desi Rodriguez, and Ismael Sanogo, the Pirates would appear in their fourth consecutive NCAA tournament for the second time in program history in 2019. Led by the play of standout junior guard Myles Powell, the Pirates, at risk of missing the tournament sitting on a 16–12 overall and 7–9 Big East record, won their final two regular season games at home against 16th-ranked Marquette and 23rd-ranked Villanova and advanced to the Big East Final where they lost a rematch to Villanova by two points. Ultimately, they secured a #10 seed in the tournament following their performance down the stretch, and fell to the Wofford Terriers in a first round game in which Fletcher Magee would break Division I's all-time three-point scoring record. In November 2021, Seton Hall traveled to Ann Arbor, Michigan to play the then #4 ranked Michigan Wolverines as part of the Big East-Big10 Gavitt Games. Of note was that the game was the first time the two programs had met since the 1989 NCAA National Championship Game when Michigan beat Seton Hall by one on a controversial foul call. In the 2021 version, Seton Hall upset Michigan, making it the first time Seton Hall had won a road game against a non-conference AP top-five team in university history. They were 0-5 prior.

All-time coaching records

Postseason

NCAA tournament results
The Pirates have appeared in the NCAA tournament 14 times. 
Their combined record is 16–14.

NIT results
The Pirates have appeared in the National Invitation Tournament (NIT) 18 times. Their combined record is 8–19. They were NIT Champions in 1953.

Notable players and coaches

Honored and retired jerseys

Naismith Memorial Basketball Hall of Fame

FIBA Hall of Fame

Pirates in the NBA

31 Pirates have played at least one game in the NBA.

Pirates in international leagues
Khadeen Carrington, in the Israeli Premier Basketball League

Awards and honors

Big East Coach of the Year
P.J. Carlesimo – 1988, 1989
Louis Orr – 2003
Kevin Willard – 2016

Big East Player of the Year
Dan Callandrillo – 1982
Terry Dehere – 1993
Myles Powell – 2020
Sandro Mamukelashvili – 2021

Big East tournament Most Valuable Player
Oliver Taylor – 1991
Terry Dehere – 1993
Isaiah Whitehead – 2016

Big East Most Improved Player
Shaheen Holloway – 2000
Myles Powell – 2018
Romaro Gill – 2020

Big East Defensive Player of the Year
Jerry Walker – 1993
Fuquan Edwin – 2014
Romaro Gill – 2020

Peter A. Carlesimo Award (Metropolitan Coach of the Year)
P.J. Carlesimo – 1988, 1989
Tommy Amaker – 2000
Kevin Willard – 2016, 2017

Haggerty Award (Metropolitan Player of the Year)
Walter Dukes – 1953
Nick Werkman – 1964
Nick Galis – 1979
Dan Callandrillo – 1982
Mark Bryant – 1988
John Morton – 1989
Artūras Karnišovas – 1994
Adrian Griffin – 1996
Andre Barrett – 2004
Isaiah Whitehead – 2016
Ángel Delgado – 2017
Myles Powell – 2019, 2020

Big East Rookie of the Year
Eddie Griffin – 2001
Ángel Delgado – 2015

Big East Basketball Scholar-Athlete of the Year
Ramon Ramos – 1989
Artūras Karnišovas – 1993, 1994
Adrian Griffin – 1996
Michael Nzei – 2019
Ike Obiagu – 2021

Metropolitan Rookie of the Year
Andre McCloud – 1983
Terry Dehere – 1990
Jerry Walker – 1991
Shaheen Holloway – 1997
Darius Lane – 2000
Eddie Griffin – 2001
Eugene Harvey – 2007
Ángel Delgado – 2015

Wayman Tisdale Award (National Freshman of the Year)
Eddie Griffin – 2001

McDonald's High School All-Americans
Luther Wright – 1990
Shaheen Holloway – 1996
Andre Barrett – 2000
Eddie Griffin – 2000
Isaiah Whitehead – 2014

Consensus First Team All-Big East
Dan Callandrillo – 1982
Mark Bryant – 1988
Ramon Ramos – 1989
Terry Dehere – 1991, 1992, 1993
Andre Barrett – 2004
Brian Laing – 2008
Isaiah Whitehead – 2016
Ángel Delgado – 2017
Myles Powell – 2019, 2020
Sandro Mamukelashvili – 2021
Jared Rhoden - 2022

Consensus First Team All-Metropolitan

Dan Callandrillo – 1981, 1982
Mark Bryant – 1988
John Morton – 1989
Ramon Ramos – 1989
Michael Cooper – 1990
Terry Dehere – 1990, 1991, 1992, 1993
Anthony Avent – 1991
Jerry Walker – 1992
Arturas Karnišovas – 1993, 1994
Bryan Caver – 1994
Adrian Griffin – 1995, 1996
Danny Hurley – 1996
Shaheen Holloway – 1997, 2000

Eddie Griffin – 2001
Andre Barrett – 2002, 2003, 2004
Kelly Whitney – 2004, 2006
Eugene Harvey – 2007
Brian Laing – 2008
Jeremy Hazell – 2009, 2010, 2011
Herb Pope – 2012
Jordan Theodore – 2012
Fuquan Edwin – 2013, 2014
Isaiah Whitehead – 2016
Khadeen Carrington – 2017
Ángel Delgado – 2017, 2018
Desi Rodriguez – 2018

Consensus First Team All-Americans
 Bob Davies – 1942
 Walter Dukes – 1953
 Myles Powell – 2020
Consensus Second Team All-Americans
 Terry Dehere – 1993
Consensus Third Team All-Americans
 Nick Werkman – 1963
 Dan Callandrillo – 1982
AP Honorable Mention All-Americans
 Andre Barrett – 2004
 Isaiah Whitehead – 2016
 Ángel Delgado – 2017, 2018
 Myles Powell – 2019
 Sandro Mamukelashvili – 2021

See also
NCAA Men's Division I Final Four appearances by coaches
NCAA Men's Division I Final Four appearances by school

References

External links